Petridiobius arcticus is a species of jumping bristletail in the family Machilidae. It is found in Europe and Northern Asia (excluding China) and North America.

References

Further reading

 
 
 
 

Archaeognatha
Articles created by Qbugbot
Insects described in 1902